A truck driver or Trucker is a person who drives trucks or lorries.

Truck Driver may also refer to:

Truck Driver (1970 film), 1969 Hindi film
Truck Driver (1976 film), Punjabi language film, featuring the actress Aasia
Truck Driver (1997 film), Punjabi film
Truck Driver (1994 film), Nepalese film
Truck Driver (documentary), film on which sound director Shajith Koyeri worked
Truck Driver (video game), 2019 video game.